Robert Goebbels (born 3 April 1944) is a former politician in Luxembourg, and a former Member of the European Parliament for the Luxembourg Socialist Workers' Party, part of the Party of European Socialists.

Goebbels started his career as one of the editors in charge of international affairs in a Luxembourg daily. From 1972 to 1974 he was elected three times chairman of the Luxembourg Association of Journalists.

Goebbels’ political career started as president of the Young Socialists in 1969. He was elected secretary general of the Luxembourg Socialist Party in 1971 and regularly re-elected up to 1984.

In 1976 Goebbels was elected to the City Council of Luxembourg, and re-elected later on for 3 additional mandates.

In 1984 Goebbels was elected to the National Parliament, and afterwards re-elected 4 times. That same year, he was appointed to the Government as Secretary of State for Foreign Affairs, International Trade and Development Cooperation and as Secretary of State for Economic Affairs.

From 1984 to 1989 Goebbels attended numerous ASEAN post-ministerial conferences and co-chaired in 1985 in Bangkok the first ASEAN-EU- Conference on Economic Affairs.

In 1985 Goebbels invited to the signature of the first Schengen-Agreement. In the following years he was Luxembourg's negotiator for the Schengen Convention of 1990.

In 1986 Goebbels signed for Luxembourg the European Single Act, which launched the European single market.

In 1986 Goebbels was also appointed vice-chairman of the GATT-Conference in Punta del Este, which launched the Uruguay Round.

In 1989 Goebbels was appointed Minister of the Economy, Minister of Public Works, Minister of Transport. In the latter capacity he chaired the European Conference of Ministers of Transport.

In 1994 Goebbels was appointed Minister of the Economy, Minister of Energy, Minister of Public Works. As member of the Ecofin-Council of the EU he was involved in the launching of the Euro.

In 1999 Goebbels was elected to the European Parliament, re-elected in 2004 and 2009.

From 1999 to 2009 Goebbels served as vice-chair of the Socialist Group in the European Parliament, and as spoke-person of his group on Economic and Monetary Affairs. In addition he chaired the Lisbon network on Growth and Investments of the European Socialist Party. In 2001 Goebbels was elected chairman of the Committee on Human Genetics of the European Parliament.

In 2006 Goebbels was appointed by the Government as High Commissioner for the Luxembourg Pavilion at the Shanghai World Expo 2010.

In his 15 years in the European Parliament, Goebbels was rapporteur or co-rapporteur of numerous European legislations.

Goebbels was a member of the ACP-EU joint Parliamentary Assembly and a member of the EP-Delegation to the ASEAN countries. From 2009 to 2014 he served as first vice-president of the EP-delegation to ASEAN and attended in that capacity most of the meetings of the ASEAN Inter Parliamentary Assembly. In 2014 he was appointed EP-Member of the EU-task force for Myanmar. He served also in 2014 as chair of the EP observation-mission to the presidential elections in Egypt.

In July 2014 Goebbels retired from active politics. He continues to publish articles in the national and international press.

In March 2016 the Luxembourg Government appointed Robert Goebbels as the Luxembourg representative to the ASEF Board of Governors.

Footnotes

|-

|-

|-

Ministers for the Economy of Luxembourg
Ministers for Public Works of Luxembourg
Ministers for Transport of Luxembourg
Ministers for Energy of Luxembourg
MEPs for Luxembourg 2004–2009
Members of the Chamber of Deputies (Luxembourg)
Members of the Chamber of Deputies (Luxembourg) from Centre
Councillors in Luxembourg City
Luxembourg Socialist Workers' Party politicians
Luxembourgian journalists
Male journalists
1944 births
Living people
People from Luxembourg City
Luxembourg Socialist Workers' Party MEPs
MEPs for Luxembourg 1999–2004
MEPs for Luxembourg 2009–2014